The MHV (miniature high voltage) connector is a type of RF connector used for terminating coaxial cable.

Description 
The connector looks almost identical to a typical BNC connector, but is designed to not mate with BNC jacks. It features two bayonet lugs on the female connector; mating is fully achieved with a quarter turn of the coupling nut. The dimensions of the connector are specified in the MIL-STD-348B. MHV connectors can be recognized by the slightly protruding insulation on the male plug and the slightly different insulation length in the female jack.

Use

The MHV connector is typically rated for 1500 RMS Continuous & 5000 .volt peak and 3 ampere. With an operating frequency limited to about 300 MHz their usage is restricted to low frequency applications. It was commonly used in laboratory settings for voltages beyond the rating of BNC connectors. Furthermore they are used in:

geiger counter
scintillation probes
Transmission Lines
High Voltage Power Supplies
Nuclear Control Instrumentation
X-ray

Safety hazards
MHV connectors are presently considered by some as a safety hazard because of the possibility of high voltage on the exposed central pin when not plugged in, and because the ground connection is broken before the power connection when demating.
Despite their design differences, MHV and BNC plugs and jacks can be made to mate by brute force. This causes safety hazards, since a user can accidentally (or deliberately) mate a low voltage cable to a high voltage jack; however, in a correctly made MHV connector the pin is further back in the insulator than on BNC so theoretically they should never be able to make contact when used with BNC.

SHV connectors are designed to prevent these hazards, and cannot be mated to BNC connectors.

References 
)

External links 
MIL-STD-348B

RF connectors